Synoptic philosophy comes from the Greek word συνοπτικός synoptikos ("seeing everything together") and together with the word philosophy, means the love of wisdom emerging from a coherent understanding of everything together.

Wilfrid Sellars (1962) used the term synoptic vision.

See also
 Interdisciplinarity
 New Historicism
 Social constructivism
 Systems thinking
 Philosophy: An Introduction to the Art of Wondering

References

External links 
 Wilfrid Sellars (1962) Philosophy and the Scientific Image of Man
 Jay F. Rosenberg (1990) Fusing the Images:  Nachruf for Wilfrid Sellars 
 Introduction: Lawrence Durrell, Text, Hypertext, Intertext

Metaphilosophy
Philosophical schools and traditions